Truman is an unincorporated community in Cameron County, Pennsylvania, United States.

Notes

Unincorporated communities in Cameron County, Pennsylvania
Unincorporated communities in Pennsylvania